The autoroute A15 is an autoroute in the western suburbs of Paris, France.

The motorway starts at Gennevilliers in Hauts-de-Seine and ends in Cergy-Pontoise in Val d'Oise. The A15 was built to relieve the congested RN14 between Paris and the Cergy-Pontoise new town. The A15 is operated by the Île-de-France Council.
The A15 serves Gennevilliers, Argenteuil, Pierrelaye in Eragny, Saint-Ouen-l'Aumône and Pontoise.

List of junctions

External links

 A15 autoroute in Saratlas

A15